Thomas L. Curtright (born 1948) is a theoretical physicist at the University of Miami.  He did undergraduate work in physics at  the 
University of Missouri  (B.S., M.S., 1970), and graduate work at Caltech (Ph.D., 1977) under the supervision of Richard Feynman.

He has made numerous influential contributions  
in particle and mathematical physics, notably in supercurrent anomalies, higher-spin fields (Curtright field),  quantum Liouville theory, geometrostatic sigma models, quantum algebras, and deformation quantization.
 
Curtright is a Fellow of the American Physical Society, a co-recipient (with Charles Thorn) of the SESAPS Jesse Beams Award, a University of Miami Cooper Fellow, and a recipient of the Distinguished Faculty Scholar Award from the University's Senate.   He is also the recipient of Distinguished Alumni Awards from the Department of Physics and Astronomy (2021) and from the College of Arts and Science (2022), University of Missouri at Columbia. 

He has co-edited and co-authored several books ,
notably on quantum mechanics in phase space.

References

External links
Professor Curtright's website at the University of Miami.
Caltech PhD dissertation on stability and supersymmetry (publicly available; supervised by Richard Feynman).
ORCID profile

21st-century American physicists
Living people
Fellows of the American Physical Society
1948 births
Theoretical physicists
California Institute of Technology alumni
University of Missouri alumni
Physicists from Missouri
Scientists from Missouri
Mathematical physicists
People from Paris, Missouri
University of Missouri physicists